Felipe Antonio Hernández Sanhueza (born 10 May 1988) is a Chilean former footballer.

Honours
Colo-Colo
 Chilean Primera División (4): 2006–A, 2006–C, 2007–A, 2007–C

External links
 
 

1988 births
Living people
People from Curicó
Chilean footballers
Colo-Colo footballers
Puerto Montt footballers
Rangers de Talca footballers
Magallanes footballers
Deportes Magallanes footballers
Curicó Unido footballers
Primera B de Chile players
Chilean Primera División players
Association football midfielders